The Balder-class patrol vessels were a class of five patrol vessels built for the Royal Netherlands Navy in the 1950s at the Rijkswerf in Willemsoord, Den Helder. They were paid for by the United States under the Mutual Defense Assistance Program (MDAP). The ships were used to patrol the Dutch coast and waterways.

History 
The construction of the Balder-class patrol vessels was paid for by the United States under the Mutual Defense Assistance Program (MDAP). Initially the Netherlands wanted to build 16 ships, but since the United States only wanted to pay for the construction of a maximum of five ships it was decided to only build five ships. The five ships of the Balder-class were constructed at the Rijkswerf in Willemsoord, Den Helder.

Service history 
The Balder-class vessels were used to patrol the Dutch coast and waterways. Furthermore, they were also used to inspect fishing vessels and enforce fishing rules and laws in Dutch territorial waters. In wartime the ships could escort small convoys near the Dutch coast. After the retirement of the Balder-class patrol vessels in the 1980s most tasks related to the inspection of fishing vessels and enforcement of fishing rules and laws was transferred from the Royal Netherlands Navy to the newly established Netherlands Coastguard.

Ships in class 
The vessels in this class were named after the gods in Norse mythology.

Notes

Citations

References

 

Patrol vessels of the Royal Netherlands Navy
Patrol ship classes